The following is a list of notable deaths in November 1998.

Entries for each day are listed alphabetically by surname. A typical entry lists information in the following sequence:
 Name, age, country of citizenship at birth, subsequent country of citizenship (if applicable), reason for notability, cause of death (if known), and reference.

November 1998

1
Augusto Magli, 75, Italian football player.
Kunitaka Sueoka, 81, Japanese football player.
Norbert Wollheim, 85, German-American Holocaust survivor.
Stanislav Zhuk, 63, Russian Olympic skater and coach, heart attack.

2
Janet Arnold, 66, British clothing historian, costume designer and author, lymphoma.
Sverre Brodahl, 89, Norwegian Nordic skier and Olympic medalist.
Claude Bramall Burgess, 88, Hong Kong Colonial Secretary.
Fred Freer, 82, Australian cricket player.
Henry Horton, 75, English sportsman.
Rolf Husberg, 90, Swedish film director, screenwriter and actor.
Jovelina Pérola Negra, 54, Brazilian samba singer and songwriter, heart attack.
Elmo Plaskett, 60, United States Virgin Islands baseball player.
Vincent Winter, 50, Scottish child film actor, heart attack.

3
Ray Bremser, 64, American poet.
Helmuth Johannsen, 78, German football player and manager.
Bob Kane, 83, American comic book writer (Batman).
John Campbell Merrett, 89, Canadian architect.
P. L. Narayana, 63, Indian film actor and playwright.
Martha O'Driscoll, 76, American film actress.
Oriano Quilici, 68, Italian prelate of the Catholic Church.
Nina Youshkevitch, 77, Franco-Russian ballet dancer and teacher.

4
Jean de Heinzelin de Braucourt, 78, Belgian geologist.
Marion Donovan, 81, American inventor and entrepreneur.
Lars Ernster, 78, Swedish biochemist and Nobel Foundation board member.
Joyce Lussu, 86, Italian writer and partisan during World War II.
Jimmy McGee, 75, Irish basketball player and musician.
Jorge Wehbe, 78, Argentine lawyer and economist, Minister of Economy.

5
Garlin Murl Conner, 79, United States Army officer during World War II and Medal of Honor recipient.
Momoko Kōchi, 66, Japanese actress (Godzilla), cancer.
Nagarjun, 87, Indian poet.
Jack Stewart, 86, Australian farmer and politician.

6
Mohamed Taki Abdoulkarim, President of the Comoros.
Hélmer Herrera Buitrago, 47, Colombian narco and member of the Cali Cartel, shot.
Jack Hartman, 73, American gridiron football player and basketball coach.
Bobo Lewis, 72, American comedic actress, cancer.
Sky Low Low, 70, Canadian midget wrestler, heart attack.
Niklas Luhmann, 70, German sociologist and philosopher of social science.
Wolfgang Stresemann, 94, German jurist, orchestra leader, conductor and composer.
István Szőts, 86, Hungarian screenwriter and film director.
Stan Wright, 77, American track and field coach.

7
Jitendra Abhisheki, 69, Indian vocalist, composer and music scholar.
Leonard De Paur, 83, American composer and choral director.
Agenore Fabbri, 87, Italian sculptor and painter.
Margaret Gowing, 77, English historian, Alzheimer's disease.
John Hunt, Baron Hunt, 88, British Army officer.
Vladimir Matskevich, 88, Soviet apparatchik and ambassador.
Börje Mellvig, 86, Swedish actor, screenwriter, director and lyricist.
Ted Slevin, English rugby player.
Jiwan Singh Umranangal, 84, Indian politician.
O. Meredith Wilson, 89, American historian and academic, brain cancer.

8
Rumer Godden, 90, English author (Black Narcissus), complications from a series of strokes.
Jemal Karchkhadze, Georgian writer.
Thomas Henry Manning, 86, British-Canadian Arctic explorer, geographer, zoologist, and author.
Jean Marais, 84, French actor, writer and sculptor, cardiovascular disease.
Lonnie Pitchford, 43, American blues musician and instrument maker.
Erol Taş, 70, Turkish film actor, diabetes.

9
Baya, 66, Algerian artist.
Henry Dorman, 82, American lawyer and politician.
Anura Ranasinghe, 42, Sri Lankan cricketer, heart attack.
Ursula Reit, 84, German actress.
Francis Scully, 73, American sailor and Olympic medalist.

10
Svetlana Beriosova, 66, Lithuanian-British prima ballerina, cancer.
Peter Cotes, 86, English actor, writer, and director.
Mahmoud Hassan, 78, Egyptian Greco-Roman bantamweight wrestler and Olympic medalist.
Henry James, 78, British civil servant (born 1919).
Jean Leray, 92, French mathematician.
Georg Liebsch, 87, German featherweight weightlifter and Olympian.
Mary Millar, 62, British actress (Keeping Up Appearances) and singer, ovarian cancer.
Hal Newhouser, 77, American baseball player (Detroit Tigers) and member of the MLB Hall of Fame, respiratory disease.
Ellis Robinson, 87, English cricketer.

11
Frank Brimsek, 83, American ice hockey player.
Patrick Clancy, 76, Irish folk singer, lung cancer.
Gérard Grisey, 52, French composer of contemporary classical music, ruptured aneurysm.
Ferdinand Kulmer, 73, Croatian abstract painter.
Allan Kwartler, 81, American sabre and foil fencer.
Sam Melberg, 86, Norwegian sports diver and Olympian.
Elvis Jacob Stahr, Jr., 82, American government official and college president.
Anicet Utset, 66, Spanish cyclist.

12
Janet Alcoriza, 80, American screenwriter and actress.
Jack Gelineau, 74, Canadian ice hockey player, cancer.
James H. Gray, 92, Canadian journalist, historian and author.
Paul Hoffman, 73, American basketball player, brain tumor.
Roy Hollis, 72, English football player.
Asher Joel, 86, Australian politician and public servant.
Kenny Kirkland, 43, American pianist and keyboardist, congestive heart failure.
Lu Ann Meredith, 85, American film actress.
Sally Shlaer, 59, American mathematician, software engineer and methodologist.

13
Don Bishop, 64, American gridiron football player.
Joseph C. Brun, 91, French-American cinematographer.
Edwige Feuillère, 91, French actress.
Valerie Hobson, 81, Irish-born actress, heart attack.
Red Holzman, 78, American basketball player and coach, leukemia.
Hendrik Timmer, 94, Dutch sportsman and Olympic medalist.
Michel Trudeau, 23, Canadian outdoorsman and brother of Prime Minister Justin Trudeau, avalanche.
Ilie Văduva, 64, Romanian communist politician.
Doug Wright, 84, English cricket player.

14
Eli Cashdan, 93, British rabbi.
Quentin Crewe, 72, English journalist, author, restaurateur and adventurer.
Albert Frey, 95, Swiss-American architect.
Rachel Holzer, 99, Australian theatre actress and director.

15
Stokely Carmichael, 57, Trinidadian-American political activist, prostate cancer.
Henryk Chmielewski, 84, Polish boxer and Olympian.
Lawrence Krader, 78, American socialist anthropologist and ethnologist.
Federico Krutwig, 77, Spanish Basque writer, philosopher, and politician.
William T. Miller, 87, American professor of organic chemistry.
Doris Niles, 93, American dancer.
Leo Aloysius Pursley, 96, American clergyman of the Roman Catholic Church.

16
Ludvík Daněk, 61, Czechoslovak discus thrower and Olympic champion, heart attack.
Tyrone Delano Gilliam, Jr., 32, American convicted murderer, execution by lethal injection.
Mohammad-Taqi Ja'fari, 73, Iranian scholar, philosopher and Islamic theologist.
Queenie McKenzie, 68, Aboriginal Australian artist.
Alexander Smorchkov, 78, Soviet fighter pilot during World War II and the Korean War.
J. D. Sumner, 73, American gospel singer and songwriter.

17
Kea Bouman, 94, Dutch tennis player.
Weeb Ewbank, 91, American football coach (Baltimore Colts, New York Jets) and member of the Pro Football Hall of Fame, heart problems.
Efim Geller, 73, Soviet chess player and grandmaster.
Jean Herly, 78, Monegasque diplomat and ambassador.
Reinette L'Oranaise, 80, Algerian singer.
Kenneth McDuff, 52, American serial killer, execution by lethal injection.
Jacques Médecin, 70, French politician, cardiac arrest.
Miguel A. García Méndez, 96, Puerto Rican lawyer and politician.
Dick O'Neill, 70, American actor (The Jerk, The Taking of Pelham One Two Three, Cagney & Lacey).
Esther Rolle, 78, American actress (Good Times, Maude, Driving Miss Daisy), Emmy winner (1979), diabetes.
Bill Ward, 79, American cartoonist (Torchy).

18
Telemaco Arcangeli, 75, Italian racewalker and Olympian.
Norma Connolly, 71, American actress.
Hal Davis, 65, American songwriter and record producer.
Robin Hall, 62, Scottish folksinger.
Jeanine Moulin, 86, Belgian poet and literary scholar.
Aurélio de Lira Tavares, 93, Brazilian Army general.

19
Louis Dumont, French anthropologist.
Ted Fujita, 78, Japanese-American meteorologist.
Alfred 'Ken' Gatward, 84, British Royal Air Force pilot during World War II.
Earl Kim, 78, American composer, and music pedagogue, lung cancer.
William J. McCarthy, 79, American labor leader.
Alan J. Pakula, 70, American film director and producer (All the President's Men, The Parallax View, To Kill a Mockingbird), traffic collision.

20
Roland Alphonso, 67, Jamaican tenor saxophonist.
Marian Brandys, 86, Polish writer and screenwriter.
George Brophy, 72, American baseball executive.
Howard Wilson Emmons, 86, American professor in Mechanical Engineering.
Meredith Gourdine, 69, American physicist, athlete and Olympic medalist.
John Grimek, 88, American bodybuilder and weightlifter.
Cec Luining, 67, Canadian football player.
Mario Orozco Rivera, 68, Mexican muralist and painter.
Dick Sisler, 78, American baseball player, coach and manager.
Galina Starovoytova, 52, Soviet dissident, assassinated, firearm.

21
Thomas V. Bermingham, American Jesuit priest and Classical scholar.
Dariush Forouhar, 69–70, Iranian pan-Iranist politician, murdered.
Otto Frankel, 98, Austrian-Australian geneticist.
Dave Huffman, 41, American football player, traffic collision.
Giles Pellerin, 91, American gridiron football player.
Alvin P. Shapiro, 77, American physician and professor, complications of kidney failure.
Ormond R. Simpson, 83, United States Marine Corps officer.
Fabian Ver, 78, Filipino military officer, pulmonary complications.
Nosson Meir Wachtfogel, 88, Russian-American Orthodox rabbi.

22
Harlan Parker Banks, 85, American paleobotanist and phycologist.
Vladimir Demikhov, 82, Soviet scientist and organ transplantation pioneer.
Henry Hampton, 58, American filmmaker.
Mikołaj Kozakiewicz, 74, Polish politician, publicist and sociologist.
Harry Lehmann, 74, German physicist.
Celeste Mendoza, 68, Cuban singer.
Holt Rast, 81, American football player.
Jack Shadbolt, 89, Canadian painter.
Stu Ungar, 45, American professional poker, blackjack, and gin rummy player, heart problems.

23
Lamar McHan, 65, American football player and coach, heart attack.
Gene Moore, 88, American designer and window dresser.
Dan Osman, 35, American extreme sport practitioner, rock climbing accident.
Ralph S. Phillips, 85, American mathematician and academic.
Don Ray, 77, American basketball player.
Eugen Seiterle, 84, Swiss field handball player and Olympic medalist.

24
Len Barnum, 86, American gridiron football player.
John Chadwick, 78, English linguist and classical scholar who deciphered Linear B.
Minnette de Silva, 80, Sri Lankan architect.
Eprime Eshag, 80, Iranian economist.
Guido Figone, 71, Italian gymnast.
Nicholas Kurti, 90, Hungarian-British physicist.
George F. Sprague, 96, American geneticist and researcher.
Theodore Strongin, 79, American music critic, composer, flautist, and entomologist.
Nikola Tanhofer, 71, Croatian film director, screenwriter and cinematographer.

25
Robert Eisner, 76, American author and economist, bone marrow disorder.
Nelson Goodman, 92, American philosopher.
Parmeshwar Narayan Haksar, 85, Indian diplomat.
Anwar Mesbah, 85, Egyptian weightlifter and Olympic champion.
Enrico Sabbatini, 66, Italian costume designer (The Mission, Seven Years in Tibet, Cutthroat Island) and production designer, traffic collision.
Fiatau Penitala Teo, 87, Tuvalu political figure.
Flip Wilson, 64, American comedian and actor, liver cancer.

26
Gerald Battrick, 51, Welsh tennis player.
Charles Moihi Te Arawaka Bennett, 85, New Zealand broadcaster, military leader and public servant.
Mike Calvert, 85, British Army officer.
M. T. Cheng, 81, Chinese mathematician.
Ox Emerson, 90, American football player.
Gyo Fujikawa, 90, American illustrator and children's author.
Tom Lyon, 83, Scottish footballer.
Ed Smith, 69, American basketball player (New York Knicks).

27
Barbara Acklin, 55, American soul singer and songwriter, pneumonia.
William Baxter, 69, American professor of law.
Gloria Fuertes, 81, Spanish poet and children's author, lung cancer.
Jozef IJsewijn, 65, Flemish Latinist.
Douglas LePan, 84, Canadian diplomat, poet, novelist and professor of literature.
Herman Murray, 89, Canadian ice hockey player.
Andrey Sergeev, 65, Russian writer and translator, traffic accident.
Vicki Viidikas, 50, Australian poet.

28
Dante Fascell, 81, American politician, colorectal cancer.
Frederick William Freking, 85, American prelate of the Roman Catholic Church, emphysema.
M. Donald Grant, 94, American baseball executive (New York Mets).
Roberta Kevelson, 67, American academic and semiotician.
James C. Lucas, 86, American criminal and inmate of Alcatraz penitentiary.
Augie Scott, 77, English football player and manager.
Maurice Seynaeve, 91, Belgian cyclo-cross rider.
John Stanford, 60, American Army officer.
Kerry Wendell Thornley, 60, American counterculture figure and writer, heart attack.

29
Roy Benavidez, 63, United States Army Special Forces member and Medal of Honor recipient, complications of diabetes.
Gino De Dominicis, 51, Italian artist.
Maus Gatsonides, 87, Dutch rally driver and inventor.
Jack Gilbert, 80, Australian World War II veteran and rugby player.
Giant Haystacks, 52, British professional wrestler, lymphoma.
Pépé Kallé, 46, Congolese musician, heart attack.
Frank Latimore, 73, American actor.
Živojin Pavlović, 65, Yugoslav and Serbian film director, writer, and painter.
Robin Ray, 64, English broadcaster, actor, and musician, lung cancer.
Jim Turner, 95, American baseball player.
George Van Eps, 85, American swing and jazz guitarist, pneumonia.

30
Pentti Aalto, 81, Finnish linguist, heart disease.
Abdullah Al-Muti, 68, Bangladeshi educationist and writer.
Ruth Clifford, 98, American actress.
Alfo Ferrari, 74, Italian cyclist.
Jesse Levan, 72, American baseball player.
Ad Liska, 92, American  baseball pitcher.
Simon Nkoli, 41, South African anti-apartheid and gay rights activist, AIDS.
Johnny Roventini, 88, American actor.
Philip Sterling, 76, American actor.
James Strauch, 77, American Olympic fencer.
Margaret Walker, 83, American poet and writer, breast cancer.

References 

1998-11
 11